Gold is the debut studio album of Nigerian recording artist Adekunle Gold, released on 28 July 2016, by YBNL Nation. Prior to its release, three songs were released off the album to positive reviews, with "Sade" and "Orente" being his breakthrough singles.

Singles
Since signing to YBNL Nation in 2015, Adekunle Gold's music career was brought to the spotlight upon the release of "Sade" which launched his career and won the Best Alternative Song at The Headies 2015. His follow-up single titled "Orente" also did well commercially before he released "Pick Up", a Pheelz-produced song which combined a little of contemporary fuji and afropop.

Commercial performance
The album peaked at #7 on Billboard'''s World Album Charts for the week of 13 August 2016.

Critical reception

The album has received positive reviews from music critics. Online magazine Filter Free scored "Gold" 94%, explaining that "this album comes from a deep place of artistic excellence... it deserves applause" 

AccoladesGold'' was nominated for Album of the Year at the 2017 Nigeria Entertainment Awards. It was also nominated for Album of the Year and Best R&B/Pop Album at The Headies 2018.

References

YBNL Nation albums
2016 albums
Albums produced by Masterkraft (producer)
Albums produced by Pheelz
Albums produced by B.Banks
Adekunle Gold albums
Yoruba-language albums